An XML firewall is a specialized device used to protect applications exposed through XML based interfaces like WSDL and REST and scan XML traffic coming into and going out from an organization. Typically deployed in a DMZ environment an XML Firewall is often used to validate XML traffic, control access to XML based resources, filter XML content and rate limit requests to back-end applications exposed through XML based interfaces. XML Firewalls are commonly deployed as hardware but can also be found as software and virtual appliance for VMWare, Xen or Amazon EC2. A number of brands of XML Firewall exist and they often differ based on parameters like performance (with or without hardware acceleration, 32 Vs 64 bit), scalability (how do they cluster and perform under load), security certification (common criteria, FIPS being the most common), identity support (for  SAML, OAuth, enterprise SSO solutions) and extensibility (they can support different transport protocols like IBM MQ, Tibco EMS, etc.). XML Firewalling functionality is typically embedded inside  XML Appliances and SOA Gateways.

See also
XML appliance
Web Services
WS-Security
Representational State Transfer

Firewall software